Oleksandr Mykolayovych Koval (born 3 May 1974 in Donetsk) is a Ukrainian football coach and a former player. He works as an assistant coach in Metalist 1925 Kharkiv.

Honours
Shakhtar Donetsk
Ukrainian Premier League runner-up: 1993–94, 1996–97, 1997–98, 1998–99, 1999–2000
Ukrainian Cup winner: 1994–95, 1996–97

References

External links
 

1974 births
Footballers from Donetsk
Living people
Ukrainian footballers
Ukraine international footballers
Ukraine under-21 international footballers
FC Shakhtar Donetsk players
Ukrainian Premier League players
FC Metalurh Donetsk players
PFC Levski Sofia players
Ukrainian expatriate footballers
Expatriate footballers in Bulgaria
Ukrainian expatriate sportspeople in Bulgaria
First Professional Football League (Bulgaria) players
FC Sokol Saratov players
Expatriate footballers in Russia
Ukrainian expatriate sportspeople in Russia
Russian Premier League players
FC Stal Alchevsk players
FC Monolit Kostiantynivka players
Association football defenders